Patrick Bernard Clift (14 July 1953 – 2 September 1996) was a Zimbabwean first class cricketer for Leicestershire County Cricket Club, who was educated at St. George's College, Harare. He was a right-armed medium bowler and right-handed batsman. Clift died in South Africa after a battle with bone marrow cancer, in the same year that Leicestershire won the County Championship.

Career highlights
 In April 1976 he took 8 for 17 for Leicestershire against Marylebone Cricket Club at Lord's. He finished the season with 74 wickets at 20.18. This tally included a hat-trick against Yorkshire at Grace Road.
 Won the Benson & Hedges Cup in 1985, taking 2 for 40.
 Made 100 not out in just 50 minutes against Sussex at Hove in 1983. It was the fastest century ever scored by a player for Leicestershire.
 Holds Rhodesia's eighth and ninth wicket records.
 Took 5 catches in an innings at Worcester in 1976.
 In 1984 he took 8 for 26 at Edgbaston.

External links
 

1953 births
1996 deaths
Deaths from multiple myeloma
KwaZulu-Natal cricketers
Leicestershire cricketers
Zimbabwean cricketers
Rhodesia cricketers
Deaths from cancer in South Africa
Alumni of St. George's College, Harare
Zimbabwean cricket coaches